Ivan "Guti" Jovanović (born 1 December 1978) is a Serbian former professional footballer who played as a midfielder.

Career
In the first half of the 2000s, Jovanović played for five Belgrade-based clubs in the First League of Serbia and Montenegro, spending the most time with Rad and Obilić. He also had a brief but successful spell at Voždovac, before transferring abroad to China (Shanghai Shenhua) in early 2006. In the second half of the 2000s, Jovanović went on to play in Belgium (Lokeren), Israel (Hapoel Be'er Sheva), and Macedonia (Rabotnički and Vardar), before returning to his homeland and joining Serbian SuperLiga side Smederevo.

In the summer of 2010, Jovanović moved abroad for the second time and joined Cypriot club AEP Paphos. He later played for Borac Čačak and Sinđelić Beograd, before hanging up his boots in 2014.

Honours
Sinđelić Beograd
 Serbian League Belgrade: 2012–13

References

External links
 
 
 

AEP Paphos FC players
Association football midfielders
Belgian Pro League players
Chinese Super League players
Cypriot First Division players
Expatriate footballers in Belgium
Expatriate footballers in China
Expatriate footballers in Cyprus
Expatriate footballers in Israel
Expatriate footballers in North Macedonia
First League of Serbia and Montenegro players
FK Borac Čačak players
FK Dubočica players
FK Obilić players
FK Rabotnički players
FK Rad players
FK Sinđelić Beograd players
FK Smederevo players
FK Vardar players
FK Voždovac players
FK Zemun players
Hapoel Be'er Sheva F.C. players
K.S.C. Lokeren Oost-Vlaanderen players
Macedonian First Football League players
OFK Beograd players
Serbia and Montenegro expatriate footballers
Serbia and Montenegro expatriate sportspeople in China
Serbia and Montenegro footballers
Serbian expatriate footballers
Serbian expatriate sportspeople in Belgium
Serbian expatriate sportspeople in China
Serbian expatriate sportspeople in Cyprus
Serbian expatriate sportspeople in Israel
Serbian expatriate sportspeople in North Macedonia
Serbian First League players
Serbian footballers
Serbian SuperLiga players
Shanghai Shenhua F.C. players
Sportspeople from Leskovac
1978 births
Living people